The Scugog Cup was a bonspiel part of the men's Ontario Curling Tour. The event was an annual event held in November and takes place at the Port Perry Community Curling Club in Port Perry, Ontario. It was last held in 2015.

Past Champions

External links
2012 Event Site

Ontario Curling Tour events